WATM may refer to:

 WATM, the ICAO code for Alor Island Airport, Indonesia
 WATM-TV, a television station in Pennsylvania, USA